Pocono Snow was an American soccer team based in East Stroudsburg, Pennsylvania, United States. Founded in 2008, the team plays in the National Premier Soccer League (NPSL), a national amateur league at the fourth tier of the American Soccer Pyramid, in the Northeast Keystone Division.

The team plays its home games at Eiler-Martin Stadium on the campus of East Stroudsburg University, where they have played since 2009.  The team's colors are orange, blue, and white.

History
 The team was founded in 2008 and is no longer in operation as of 2014

Players

2012 Roster
Source:

Year-by-year

Head coaches
  Anthony Creece (2009)
  James Ellison (2010)
  Winga Siwale (2011–present)

Stadia
 Eiler-Martin Stadium at East Stroudsburg University; East Stroudsburg, Pennsylvania (2009–present)

External links
 Pocono Snow

National Premier Soccer League teams
Amateur soccer teams in Pennsylvania
Soccer clubs in Pennsylvania
2008 establishments in Pennsylvania